Elizabeth was a merchant ship built at Singapore, British India in 1830. She made one voyage transporting convicts from the Swan River Colony to Sydney, Australia. She wrecked in 1839.

Career
Under the command of Charles Pritchard, she left Singapore on 16 July 1838, with cargo and passengers. She called in at King George's Sound, then the Swan River Colony, where she offloaded some cargo and transported three prisoners, then sailed to Port Adelaide where she offloaded her passengers, called in at Port Phillip and then arrived in Sydney on 16 December 1838, where she offloaded the three prisoners and the rest of her cargo. Elizabeth departed Port Jackson in January 1829, under the command of Roberts Garrett bound for Guam and Manila in ballast.

Fate
After returning from Singapore with a cargo of goods, she was driven ashore during a gale on 21/22 September 1839, along Cottesloe Beach, Western Australia.

Citations

References
 
 
Sydney Register (1837)

External links
The wreck of the Elizabeth

1830 ships
British ships built in Singapore
Convict ships to New South Wales
Age of Sail merchant ships
Merchant ships of the United Kingdom
Maritime incidents in September 1839
Shipwrecks of Western Australia